Rinoctes nasutus, the abyssal smooth-head, is a species of slickhead that is found at depths of  to  in the Atlantic Ocean, and possibly in the Indian and Pacific Oceans. This species is the only known species in its genus. It grows to a length of  SL.

References

Alepocephalidae
Monotypic ray-finned fish genera
Monotypic marine fish genera
Taxa named by Albert Eide Parr